Redemptioners were European immigrants, generally in the 18th or early 19th century, who gained passage to American Colonies (most often Pennsylvania) by selling themselves into indentured servitude to pay back the shipping company which had advanced the cost of the transatlantic voyage. British indentured servants generally did not arrive as redemptioners after the early colonial period due to certain protections afforded them by law. Redemptioners were at a disadvantage because they negotiated their indentures upon arrival after a long and difficult voyage with no prospect to return to their homelands.

History
Up until the American Revolutionary War, some convicts from the United Kingdom were transported to the American Colonies and served out their time as indentured servants before receiving an official pardon. Labor was in demand in North America and so free persons were also recruited. Those who could not afford to pay their own way, came under indentures which obligated them to work for no wages until their land and sea transportation and other expenses had been covered. Because of abuse of the system, which included lying to recruits and even shanghaiing them, the British Parliament enacted laws protecting British subjects from the worst abuses. The law required that the specific terms and conditions of servitude be approved by a magistrate in Great Britain, and that any indentures not bearing a magistrate's seal were unenforceable in the colonies. This resulted in British indentured servants becoming less attractive to potential colonial masters. A similar law was passed in Ireland in an act of Parliament whereby in return for passage to America, the servant gave the purchaser of his indenture all rights to his labour for an agreed period of time, usually four years.  Once a candidate for indentured servitude was identified, the emigration agent or visiting ship captain negotiated a binding contract detailing the terms and benefits, and the contract presented before a local magistrate.

Non-British immigrants had no such protections. If they used the redemptioner system, they were forced to negotiate their indentures with their future master at the worst possible time, before they were allowed to leave a stinking, vermin-infested ship at the end of a long voyage.

A few early 18th-century Europeans, typically German-speaking immigrants to the American Colonies, later sent for family members in the old world by agreeing with the shipping companies to "redeem" their loved ones off the arriving vessel by paying the passage —more or less a form of COD for human cargo. Ships' owners soon saw this as a lucrative opportunity. They recruited Europeans to emigrate without payment up front and allowed anyone in the new world to redeem the travelers. The fare was set by the shipping company and the prospective master bargained directly with the immigrant to determine how many years he or she would work to pay off the "loan" of the fare.

More than half of 18th- and early 19th-century German-speaking immigrants came as redemptioners.

To fill empty holds, poor Europeans were recruited onto ships in Rotterdam by “Neulaender” (singular = Neulander) or “new worlders” who had worked out their time as indentured servants in the colonies. Neulaender received a commission for each person they brought to the ship so they were not always a trustworthy source of information about how the program would work for the emigrant. The Neulaender were dressed in fancy clothes to impress the peasants as they wandered about Germanic countries to begin recruiting.

The vast majority of these poor go-now-pay-later travelers were not redeemed by family members, so the term is misleading in that most paid for their emigration with their own toil, tears, and sometimes their life. In America their labour was considered a good to be lawfully bought and sold until their indentures matured. The big differences between redemptioners and African slaves, were that redemptioners came of their own accord (even if misinformed) and that they had some legal rights and an “out of indentures” date to look forward to. An example of how the indentured servant was viewed is the 1662 Virginia law that forced both slave and indentured servant females who bore children by their masters to serve after their indentures for an additional two years for the local churchwardens  no penalty was specified for their masters. On the other hand, a Virginia law of the same year stipulated that "any servant giving notice to their masters (having just cause of complaint against them) for harsh and bad usage, or else for want of diet or convenient necessaries... [shall] have remedy for his grievances."

Abuse of redemptioners on board ship is well documented. If a person died after half way across the Atlantic, the surviving family members had to pay the deceased’s fare as well as their own. Their baggage was often pilfered by the crew. Many travelers started their journey with sufficient funds to pay their way but were overcharged so that they arrived with a debt to settle and they also had to be redeemed. If the ship needed to sail before some of the passengers’ indentures had been sold, an agent in the American port kept them confined until a buyer presented himself.

The redemptioners who became indentured servants ended up working as farm laborers, household help, in workshops, and even as store clerks. They were typically prevented from marrying until after their term of service. Often, the terms of separation after the contract stipulated that the servant receive a suit of clothing and sometimes a shovel and/or an axe. Also, some contracts required the master to teach the servant to read and write from the Bible. Conditions were sometimes harsh as evidenced by the lists and paid announcements for the return of escaped servants in contemporary newspapers.

The Rotterdam ships always stopped first in the U.K. (often at Cowes) to clear British customs, before proceeding to the Colonies. A list of indenture registrations in Philadelphia from 1772 to 1773 survives and reveals that most worked five to seven years to pay their masters off (The Bible allowed no more than seven years term of any contract, and this influenced both the law and public opinion).

Accounts
The only two surviving first-person accounts by redemptioners were published in September 2006 in the book Souls for Sale: Two German Redemptioners Come to Revolutionary America. By coincidence, they both arrived in Philadelphia on the ship Sally in the fall of 1772. John Frederick Whitehead and Johann Carl Buettner were recruited in Baltic cities and shipped as virtual prisoners to Rotterdam, originally to be delivered to ships of the Dutch East India Company departing for Indonesia. Their handlers missed that opportunity so they settled for handing them over to a ship bound for Pennsylvania.

Over time, Germans out of indentures formed German-American societies and one important activity for them was to lobby for humane regulations and policing of the shipping companies.

The German immigrant to Missouri, Gottfried Duden, whose published letters (1829) did much to encourage German-speaking emigration to the U.S. in the 1800s wrote about the redemptioners. “The poor Europeans who think they have purchased the land of their desires by the hardships endured during the journey across the sea are enslaved for five, seven, or more years for a sum that any vigorous day laborer earns within six months. The wife is separated from the husband, the children from their parents, perhaps never to see each other again.”

By the time Duden published his letters, the redemptioner system was all but dead. As many as 50% to 70% of Germans coming to America in the 1700s came as redemptioners.

See also

Slavery in the colonial United States
Indentured servitude in the Americas
Indentured servitude in Pennsylvania
Indentured servitude in Virginia
Indian slave trade in the American Southeast
Gottlieb Mittelberger
Plantation Act 1740
Nationality law in the American Colonies

Further reading
Karl Frederick Geiser, Redemptioners and indentured servants in the colony and commonwealth of Pennsylvania, Supplement to the Yale Review, Vol. X, No. 2, August, 1901.

References

External links
 Legal status of indentured servants
 A substantial, translated excerpt from Gottlieb Mittelberger’s 1754 book
 A Register of German redemptioners is available for research use at the Historical Society of Pennsylvania.  It consists of two volumes dating from 1785-1804 and 1817-1831 that contain the names of and further information on German immigrants who became indentured as servants in Philadelphia in order to repay the cost of their trans-Atlantic voyage.

19th-century colonization of the Americas
History of immigration to the United States
Indentured servitude in the Americas
Social history of the United States